Arız can refer to:

 Arız, Karacabey
 Arız, Kastamonu